Solute carrier family 25 member 39 is a protein that in humans is encoded by the SLC25A39 gene. The protein has been shown to be necessary for the import of the major antioxidant glutathione into the mitochondria.

See also

References

Further reading

Solute carrier family